Ebley is a community in Gloucestershire, England.  It was once a village, and is now part of the Stroud urban area.  It lies in the valley of the River Frome, 2 miles west of the town centre of Stroud.  It is part of the civil parish of Cainscross.

Ebley was historically in the parish of Stonehouse.  It became part of the parish of Cainscross when it was formed in 1894.

Ebley Mill, on the banks of the River Frome, was a woollen mill built in 1818.  It is now a Grade II* listed building, and is used as the offices of Stroud District Council.

Ebley Chapel is a chapel of the Countess of Huntingdon's Connexion.  It is a Grade II listed building.

Between 1903 and 1964 Ebley Crossing Halt was a railway station on what is now the Golden Valley Line.

Notable people
 John Collins Bryant (1821–1901), an American physician and author
 William Vick (1833–1911), became a photographer in Ipswich.
 Henry William Carless Davis CBE FBA (1874–1928), a British historian and editor of the Dictionary of National Biography

References

External links 

Villages in Gloucestershire
Stroud District